This is a list of the top 100 positioned players by number of appearances in Serie A, Italy's top flight football league, during its history starting from the 1929–30 season. This list does not include goals scored during 1944 Campionato Alta Italia and the 1945–46 Serie A-B, held in both rounds.

List
Players whose names are in bold are still active and currently play in Serie A. Italics show players still active but playing professional football outside Serie A.

Note: Appearances in play-off matches are not considered.

Notes 

Serie A

Association football player non-biographical articles
Lists of association football player superlatives